Findlater Castle is the old seat of the Earls of Findlater and Seafield, sitting on a -high cliff overlooking the Moray Firth on the coast of Banff and Buchan, Aberdeenshire, Scotland.

Location and etymology
The cliffs here contain quartz; the name "Findlater" is derived from the Scots Gaelic words fionn ("white") and leitir ("cliff or steep slope").

History
The first historical reference to the castle is from 1246. King Alexander III of Scotland repaired this castle in the 1260s in preparation for an invasion by King Haakon IV of Norway. The Norwegians took and held the castle for some time. The castle remains that are still there are from the 14th-century rebuilding, when the castle was redesigned based on the Roslyn Castle model.

James V of Scotland visited Findlater in November 1535 after a pilgrimage to Tain. The Laird of Findlater, an Ogilvy, was Master of Household to Mary of Guise. He lost his inheritance following sexual misconduct with his mother-in-law and making a plan to imprison his father in a cellar to deprive him of sleep and drive him insane to obtain his lands. After his father's death his mother married John Gordon, a son of the Earl of Huntly, who then took possession of the castle and lands, and promptly imprisoned her.

John Gordon, now of Findlater, fought with Lord Ogilvy in July 1562 and injured his arm. Gordon was imprisoned in Edinburgh until his victime healed, according to custom. In September 1562 Mary, Queen of Scots sent an army equipped with artillery from Dunbar Castle to besiege Findlater, and eject John Gordon of Findlater. When Mary was nearby on 20 September, she had sent her trumpeter messenger to deliver the castle to the captain of her guard, but he was refused. In October 1562 the Earl of Huntly sent Mary the keys of Findlater and Auchindoun, but she was suspicious of the low status of the messenger.

Conservation
The castle is a scheduled monument.

References

External links
Findlater family site
Portsoy poets site
Take a 360 Virtual Tour of Findlater Castle

Castles in Aberdeenshire
Scheduled Ancient Monuments in Aberdeenshire